Finger Poppin with the Horace Silver Quintet is an album by jazz pianist Horace Silver released on the Blue Note label in 1959, featuring performances by Silver with Blue Mitchell, Junior Cook, Gene Taylor, and Louis Hayes.

Reception
The AllMusic review by Steve Huey stated: "Finger Poppin' was the first album Horace Silver recorded with the most celebrated version of his quintet... It's also one of Silver's all-time classics, perfectly blending the pianist's advanced, groundbreaking hard bop style with the winning, gregarious personality conveyed in his eight original tunes. Silver always kept his harmonically sophisticated music firmly grounded in the emotional directness and effortless swing of the blues, and Finger Poppin' is one of the greatest peaks of that approach. A big part of the reason is the chemistry between the group – it's electrifying and tightly knit, with a palpable sense of discovery and excitement at how well the music is turning out... Finger Poppin' is everything small-group hard bop should be, and it's a terrific example of what made the Blue Note label's mainstream sound so infectious".

Track listing
All compositions by Horace Silver

 "Finger Poppin'" - 4:47
 "Juicy Lucy" - 5:46
 "Swingin' the Samba" - 5:17
 "Sweet Stuff" - 5:32
 "Cookin' at the Continental" - 4:54
 "Come on Home" - 5:30
 "You Happened My Way" - 5:29
 "Mellow D" - 5:37

Personnel
Horace Silver - piano
Blue Mitchell - trumpet (tracks 1-3, 5-8)
Junior Cook - tenor saxophone (tracks 1-3, 5-8)
Gene Taylor - bass
Louis Hayes - drums

Production
 Alfred Lion - production
 Reid Miles - design
 Rudy Van Gelder - engineering
 Francis Wolff - photography

References

Horace Silver albums
1959 albums
Blue Note Records albums
Albums produced by Alfred Lion
Albums recorded at Van Gelder Studio
Hard bop albums